Thomas Batliner (born 3 April 1959) is a Liechtenstein equestrian. He competed in the individual jumping event at the 1988 Summer Olympics.

References

External links
 

1959 births
Living people
Liechtenstein male equestrians
Olympic equestrians of Liechtenstein
Equestrians at the 1988 Summer Olympics
People from Chur